Laguna Lake a lake and seasonal reservoir in the upper Los Osos Valley, in San Luis Obispo, California. It lies at an elevation . The Lake is also drained by Prefumo Creek at from its eastern end at  that drains to San Luis Obispo Creek.

History
The Rancho Laguna a section of Mission San Luis Obispo lands originally enclosed the lake.

Gallery

References  

Lakes of San Luis Obispo County, California
Reservoirs in San Luis Obispo County, California